Malcolm Hartley (born 15 February 1947, Bury, Greater Manchester) is an English-born astronomer and a discoverer of minor planets and comets, who works with the UK Schmidt Telescope at the Siding Spring Observatory in Australia.

Career 

Hartley is best known for his discovery and co-discovery of 10 comets since the 1980s, among them
79P/du Toit-Hartley, 80P/Peters–Hartley, 100P/Hartley, 110P/Hartley, and C/1984 W2. Unfortunately for Hartley, in 2002, "the Anglo-Australian Observatory retrofitted its Schmidt to perform multi-object spectroscopy, essentially halting all astrophotography with the telescope and ending any future possibility for comet discovery". In November 2010, he visited NASA's Jet Propulsion Laboratory facility in California to witness the EPOXI mission flyby of comet 103P/Hartley on 4 November 2010.

Awards and honours 
The outer main-belt asteroid 4768 Hartley was named in his honour, being deputy astronomer of the UK Schmidt Telescope at Siding Spring, with which this minor planet was discovered. The official  was published by the Minor Planet Center on 27 June 1991.

See also

References

External links 
 Meet Malcolm Hartley, Discoverer of Comet Hartley 2, STARDUST-NExT, Jet Propulsion Laboratory
 
 Mmbenya.com

1947 births
21st-century Australian astronomers
20th-century British astronomers

Discoverers of comets
Discoverers of minor planets
Living people